Ski jumping at the 1998 Winter Olympics consisted of three events held from 11 February to 17 February, taking place at Hakuba Ski Jumping Stadium.

Medal summary

Medal table

Japan led the medal table with two gold medals, and four overall.

Events

Participating NOCs
Nineteen nations participated in ski jumping at the Nagano Games. South Korea made their Olympic ski jumping debut.

References

 
1998 Winter Olympics events
1998
1998 in ski jumping
Ski jumping competitions in Japan